"7 Day Weekend" is a song by Jamaican singer and actress Grace Jones.

Background and recording
"7 Day Weekend" was recorded by Jones in 1992 for the soundtrack album for the 1992 film Boomerang, in which Jones played the character Helen Strangé. The song was written by Dallas Austin, Jones and Satch Hoyt, and produced by Austin with Randy Ran, with executive production by L.A. Reid and Babyface. The single featured remixes by Austin and Ben Liebrand, among others.

Track listing and formats
12" single
A1. "7 Day Weekend" (club remix) – 5:27
A2. "7 Day Weekend" (remix instrumental) – 4:38
B1. "7 Day Weekend" (remix radio edit) – 3:33

CD single
 "7 Day Weekend" (remix radio edit) – 3:33
 "7 Day Weekend" (club remix) – 5:27
 "7 Day Weekend" (remix instrumental) – 4:38

Charts

Weekly charts

References

1992 singles
Grace Jones songs
New jack swing songs
Songs written by Dallas Austin
Songs written by Grace Jones
Song recordings produced by Dallas Austin
1992 songs
Arista Records singles
LaFace Records singles